Juan José Becerra is an Argentine writer. He has taught screenwriting at the Universidad Nacional de La Plata. He has also worked as a literary editor, ghost writer and documentary scriptwriter. He has taught at the Museo de Arte Latinoamericano de Buenos Aires (MALBA). He contributes regularly to La Agenda magazine to Radio Metro.

Works

Novels
 La interpretación de un libro. Candaya, 2012
 Toda la verdad. Seix Barral, 2011
 Miles de años. Emecé, 2004
 Atlántida. Norma, 2001
 Santo. Beatriz Viterbo, 1994

Short stories
 Dos cuentos vulgares. Ediciones El broche, 2012

Essays
 Fenómenos argentinos. Planeta 2018
 Patriotas. Planeta, 2009
 La vaca – Viaje a la pampa carnívora. Arty Latino, 2007
 Grasa. Planeta, 2007

References

Argentine writers
Living people
Year of birth missing (living people)